The 11th Reserve Division (11. Reserve-Division) was a unit of the Imperial German Army in World War I.  The division was formed on mobilization of the German Army in August 1914 as part of VI Reserve Corps.  The division was disbanded in 1919 during the demobilization of the German Army after World War I.  The division was recruited in the Province of Silesia, with some troops from other areas due to the large Polish population of Silesia.  It received the regular 23rd Infantry Brigade from the 12th Division on mobilization.

Combat chronicle

The 11th Reserve Division fought on the Western Front, participating in the opening German offensive which led to the Allied Great Retreat.  Thereafter, the division remained in the line in the Verdun region until February 1916, when it entered the Battle of Verdun.  The division later fought in the Battle of the Somme.  It remained in the Flanders-Artois region for the rest of the war, and fought in the Battle of Arras in 1917.  Allied intelligence rated the division as second class.

Order of battle on mobilization

The order of battle of the 11th Reserve Division on mobilization was as follows:

23. Infanterie-Brigade
Infanterie-Regiment Keith (1. Oberschlesisches) Nr. 22
3. Schlesisches Infanterie-Regiment Nr. 156
21. Reserve-Infanterie-Brigade
Reserve-Infanterie-Regiment Nr. 10
Reserve-Infanterie-Regiment Nr. 11
Reserve-Husaren-Regiment Nr. 4
Reserve-Feldartillerie-Regiment Nr. 11
4.Kompanie/Pionier-Bataillon Nr. 6

Order of battle on October 19, 1918

The 11th Reserve Division was triangularized in April 1915. Over the course of the war, other changes took place, including the formation of artillery and signals commands and a pioneer battalion.  The order of battle on October 19, 1918, was as follows:

23. Infanterie-Brigade
Reserve-Infanterie-Regiment Nr. 10
Infanterie-Regiment Keith (1. Oberschlesisches) Nr. 22
3. Schlesisches Infanterie-Regiment Nr. 156
1.Eskadron/Reserve-Husaren-Regiment Nr. 4
Artillerie-Kommandeur 98
Schlesisches Reserve-Feldartillerie-Regiment Nr. 11
I.Bataillon/Reserve-Fußartillerie-Regiment Nr. 5
Pionier-Bataillon Nr. 311
Divisions-Nachrichten-Kommandeur 411

References
 11. Reserve-Division (Chronik 1914/1918) - Der erste Weltkrieg
 Hermann Cron et al., Ruhmeshalle unserer alten Armee (Berlin, 1935)
 Hermann Cron, Geschichte des deutschen Heeres im Weltkriege 1914-1918 (Berlin, 1937)
 Günter Wegner, Stellenbesetzung der deutschen Heere 1815-1939. (Biblio Verlag, Osnabrück, 1993), Bd. 1
 Histories of Two Hundred and Fifty-One Divisions of the German Army which Participated in the War (1914-1918), compiled from records of Intelligence section of the General Staff, American Expeditionary Forces, at General Headquarters, Chaumont, France 1919 (1920)

Notes

Infantry divisions of Germany in World War I
Military units and formations established in 1914
Military units and formations disestablished in 1919
1914 establishments in Germany